Orthogonius caffer is a species of ground beetle in the subfamily Orthogoniinae. It was described by Boheman in 1848.

References

caffer
Beetles described in 1848